The Trabant 601 (or Trabant P601 series) was a Trabant model produced by VEB Sachsenring in Zwickau, Saxony. It was the third generation of the model, built for the longest production time, from 1964 to 1990. As a result, it is the best-known Trabant model and often referred to simply as "the Trabant" or "the Trabi". During this long production run, 2,818,547 Trabant 601s were produced overall and it was the most common vehicle in former East Germany.

Overview

In hindsight, the Trabant 601 can be considered East Germany's answer to West Germany's "People's Car", the VW Beetle. Its purpose was to provide a cheap but still reliable car that was very affordable and also easy to repair and maintain. Still, it was at the time of its release rather modern in many ways, with front wheel drive combined with transversely mounted motor, a low maintenance engine, unitary construction, rack and pinion steering, composite bodywork and independent suspension all around. The car body was made of Duroplast. The main letdown was the pre-war DKW based engine that was competitive when launched, but from the late 1950s into the 1960s, small economy cars in western countries that used two-stroke engines were replaced with cleaner and more efficient four-stroke engines, as employed from the start in the Volkswagen Beetle. Two-stroke engines of this sort, with crankcase scavenging and lubricating oil provided during fuel intake, burn their lubricating oil by design and produce smoky tailpipe emissions. However, two-stroke engines were also to be found in cars like the Western German Auto Union 1000 that ended production in 1965, and the Swedish Saab 96 that changed to four-stroke in 1967. It was planned to replace the two-stroke-motor with a Wankel engine, however, East Germany failed to develop such a motor with satisfying parameters. Later, the lack of development funds in East Germany forced the continued use of a two-stroke engine in the Trabant, thus causing this vehicle to become outdated towards the end of the 1960s and obsolete by the 1980s.

History
The Trabant 601 was a modern automobile when introduced in 1963, with 150 pre-production examples. The body was modified from the previous P50/P60 variants of the Trabant, with a heavy emphasis on the front and roof area. The back of the car was also modified with different taillights and a higher trunk loading height as compared to previous models. Overall, the design was praised, particularly on the then-modern double trapezoid design. Originally, production was only planned to run from 1967 to 1971, but instead continued until 1990. The original P 60 engine was only . In 1969 the new P62 version was offered with a  engine. In 1974, a needle roller bearing was added to the connecting rod, allowing for a 50/1 lubricant to be used. Through the addition of a two-stage carburetor in 1984, the fuel consumption was brought down by 1/100 L/km. With these additions, the top speed was measured to be 107 km/h. Even with these improvements, the fuel consumption could still rise rapidly with extended acceleration or when towing a trailer. The P601 also had an overrunning clutch when running in fourth gear.

Over the course of decades, the design of the Trabant changed little. This caused the increasingly obsolete Trabant's reputation to worsen as time progressed. However, this had little effect on the sales figures — wait times of 10 years or longer for a new car were not uncommon. The price for a new Trabant in 1985 was 8,500 Mark for the 601 Standard, and 9,700 Mark for the most expensive model, the 601 Universal S de Luxe. Available options at this time included a shelf under the instrument panel and intermittent windshield wipers. With change to 12 V in 1984, options as hazard flashers and rear window heater became available.

New models were considered with the P602, P603, and P610 being planned in Zwickau. Among other improvements researched were larger motors and also wankel engines. All improvements however were blocked by the GDR government, which considered them unnecessary and feared the extra costs.

When a successor, the Trabant 1.1, was eventually developed, it received minimal external differences. At first glance, the only changes were a new radiator grille, bumpers, taillights, a more square bonnet, and the movement of the fuel cap to the rear right of the car. Upon closer examination however, the interior was subject to many changes.

Variants

 
 Trabant 601 Standard (as Limousine & Universal).
 Trabant 601 S (Sonderwunsch - Special Edition) With optional equipment like fog lamps, rear white light, and an odometer (as Limousine & Universal).
 Trabant 601 DeLuxe. Like the 601 S and additional twin-tone colouring and chrome bumper (as Limousine & Universal).
 Trabant 601 Kübel (added in 1966). Jeep version with no doors, folding roof, auxiliary heating system, the ignition system is RFI shielded.
 Trabant 601 TRAMP (added in 1978). The civilian version of the Trabant Kübel mainly exports to Greece.
 Trabant 601 Hycomat (P601 H), 1965–1990, in limited numbers (as Limousine & Universal). Made only for users with missing or dysfunctional left leg. It had included an automatic clutching system.
 Trabant 800 RS. Rally version (1986–1988) with 771 cc engine and 5-speed manual transmission.

Technical data

Export countries

Eastern Europe

Western Europe

The 601 today

Many former DDR citizens have mixed emotions in regards to their "Trabi", which is very loud and uncomfortable and still a symbol for the demised DDR, since it was a part of the system. On the other hand, the Trabant was a robust, functional and repair-friendly car, so many people developed a strong relationship to their Trabant. Furthermore, Trabant never was a symbol of the representatives (these people rather owned Lada, Polski Fiat and Volga). Finally, the Trabant also is a symbol for breaking through the wall in 1989.

In recent years, these distinctive cars have become collectors' items, with growing popularity. Green Trabants are especially popular, as they are rumoured to bring good luck to their owners. Many Trabant owners' clubs exist throughout Europe and 601s have their fans all over the world. Also, many Trabant 601s are still used as rally racing cars.

As a symbol for a forgone era, it has inspired movies such as Go Trabi Go that presented the Trabi as a kind of East German character and could make former DDR citizens laugh "not precisely at themselves, but at the absurdities of the system under which they lived until last year," symbolised by the three main aspects of the Trabant: slow, breaks down frequently and often ridiculed by Western society. It has also seduced people like the American actor David Hasselhoff to drive a "Trabi", although he had trouble getting into it. Later, he admitted he is a fan of the Trabant. Stephen Kinzer of The New York Times likens the Trabi as a symbol for the people who built it, who “survive[d] through difficult times and ultimately triumph[ed]”. The car was also featured in the American film Everything Is Illuminated.

The Trabant 601 is the subject of Jalopy, a 2016 roadtrip video game. Set in June 1990 East Germany, during the early months of German reunification, the player is tasked to maintain a fictionalized version of the Trabant 601, the Laika 601, and eventually drive the player character's uncle using the car to Istanbul, Turkey, via Eastern and Southeastern Europe.

References

External links

Original DDR commercial for the Trabant
Video: How Trabants were made
"A club that welcomes owners and drivers of these vehicles"
Trabant 601 S de Luxe Exterior and Interior in Full 3D HD

Sachsenring vehicles
Cars introduced in 1963
1960s cars
1970s cars
Front-wheel-drive vehicles
1980s cars
1990s cars
1963 establishments in East Germany
1990 disestablishments in East Germany